Rob Dashwood (2 January 1882 – 3 December 1964) was an Australian rules footballer who played with Carlton in the Victorian Football League (VFL).

Notes

External links 

Rob Dashwood's profile at Blueseum

1882 births
1964 deaths
Australian rules footballers from Victoria (Australia)
Carlton Football Club players
South Yarra Football Club players